Quark is an album by Japanese jazz fusion keyboardist Jun Fukamachi, released in 1980 by Alfa Records. The album falls into the genres of jazz fusion and electronic music, and has been further described as both progressive and experimental. Each track is at least 10 minutes in length and consists almost entirely of various synthesizers interspersed with piano, all performed by Fukamachi himself.

Track listing

Personnel 

 Jun Fukamachi – Production, composition, arrangement, synthesizers, keyboards, piano
 Shoro Kawazoe – Executive production
 Kunihiko Murai – Executive production
 Mitsuo Koike – Engineering
 Atsushi Saito – Engineering
 Toshiano Tukui – Art direction
 Noriaki Yokosuka – Photography

References

1980 albums
Jazz fusion albums
Jazz fusion albums by Japanese artists